Sheybluy-e Olya (also Romanized as Sheyblūy-e ‘Olyā; also known as Shebīlū-ye ‘Olyā and Sheyblū-ye Bālā) is a village in Gejlarat-e Sharqi Rural District, Aras District, Poldasht County, West Azerbaijan Province, Iran. At the 2006 census, its population was 276, in 64 families.

References 

Populated places in Poldasht County